Fritz Kachler was an Austrian figure skater. He was the 1912, 1913, and 1923 World champion and the 1914 & 1924 European champion.

He did not believe that sport and nationalism should be mixed and therefore chose not to participate in the Olympic Games of 1920 and 1924. He acted as a judge in the World Figure Skating Championships of 1926 (Men, Pairs), 1927 (Men) and 1937 (Women). 

A mechanical engineer, he rose to become head of the Vienna/Lower Austria section of the Austrian Railways, after having been dismissed by the Nazis. He is buried in the Eisenstaedter family grave (plot 12G) in the Doeblinger Cemetery, Vienna, with his wife Margarethe Eisenstädter.

Competitive highlights

References

Navigation

Austrian male single skaters
1888 births
1973 deaths
Figure skaters from Vienna
World Figure Skating Championships medalists
European Figure Skating Championships medalists
Burials at Döbling Cemetery